Ekebergparken (Formerly: Sjømannsskolen) is a light rail station on the Ekeberg Line of the Oslo Tramway. It is located near Sjømannsskolen (the Seamen School) in Ekeberg and Ekebergparken Sculpture Park nearby. The station is located in the borough of Nordstrand, in Oslo, Norway.

The station opened on 11 June 1917 as part of the Ekeberg Line to Sæter. 
The station is served by lines 13 and 19, using both SL79 and SL95 trams.

References

Ekeberg
Oslo Tramway stations in Oslo
Railway stations opened in 1917
1917 establishments in Norway